Glenn Earl "Red" Olson (March 31, 1916 – November 1982) was an American football blocking back.

A native of Colo, Iowa, he played college football for Iowa from 1935 to 1937. He then played professional football in the National Football League (NFL) for the  Cleveland Rams during the 1940 season. He appeared in two NFL games. He also played for the Columbus Bullies of the American Football League in 1941 and for the Hollywood Bears of the Pacific Coast Professional Football League in 1942.

During World War II, he served in the United States Navy. He later returned to Colo where he worked at the family tire and service station. He died in 1982 at age 66.

References

1916 births
1982 deaths
Cleveland Rams players
Iowa Hawkeyes football players
Players of American football from Iowa
United States Navy personnel of World War II